Jhalda subdivision is a subdivision of the Purulia district in the state of West Bengal, India.

History
Purulia district was divided into four subdivisions, viz., Purulia Sadar, Manbazar, Jhalda and Raghunathpur, with effect from 6 April 2017, as per Order No. 100-AR/P/2R-2/1999 dated 30 March 2017 issued by the Government of West Bengal, in the Kolkata Gazette dated 30 March 2017.

Subdivisions
Purulia district is divided into the following administrative subdivisions:

Note: The 2011 census data has been recast as per reorganisation of the subdivisions. There may be minor variations.

Police stations
Police stations in the Jhalda subdivision have the following features and jurisdiction:

Blocks
Community development blocks in Jhalda subdivision are:

Gram panchayats
Gram panchayats in Jhalda subdivision are :

 Bagmundi block: Ajodhya, Beergram, Matha, Sindri, Baghmundi, Burda–Kalimati, Serengdih and Tunturi–Suisa. 
 Jhalda–I block: Ichag, Jhalda–Darda, Mathari–Khamar, Tulin, Ilu–Jargo, Kalma, Noyadih, Hensahatu, Marum Osina and Pusti.
 Jhalda–II block: Bamniya–Belyadih, Chitmu, Nowahatu, Begunkodar, Hirapur Adardih, Rigid, Chekya, Majhidih and Tatuara.  
 Joypur block: Baragram, Joypur, Ropo, Upankahan, Ghagra, Mukundapur and Sidhi–Jamra.

Education
Given in the table below (data in numbers) is a comprehensive picture of the education scenario in Purulia district, after reorganisation of the district in 2017, with data for the year 2013-14. (There may be minor variations because of data recasting).:

Note: Primary schools include junior basic schools; middle schools, high schools and higher secondary schools include madrasahs; technical schools include junior technical schools, junior government polytechnics, industrial technical institutes, industrial training centres, nursing training institutes etc.; technical and professional colleges include engineering colleges, medical colleges, para-medical institutes, management colleges, teachers training and nursing training colleges, law colleges, art colleges, music colleges etc. Special and non-formal education centres include sishu siksha kendras, madhyamik siksha kendras, centres of Rabindra mukta vidyalaya, recognised Sanskrit tols, institutions for the blind and other handicapped persons, Anganwadi centres, reformatory schools etc.

Educational institutions
The following institutions are located in Jhalda subdivision:
Ramkrishna Mahato Government Engineering College (earlier known as Purulia Government Engineering College) was established at Agharpur in 2016.
Ananda Marga College was established in 1966 at Annanda Nagar, Pundag.
Achhruram Memorial College was established in 1975 at Jhalda.
Netaji Subhas Ashram Mahavidyalaya was established in 1985 at Suisa.
Bikramjeet Goswami Memorial College was established at Jaypur in 2009.
Chitta Mahato Memorial College was established 2010 at Jargo.
Kotshila Mahavidyalaya was established in 2010 at Jiudaru.

Healthcare
The table below (all data in numbers) presents an overview of the medical facilities available and patients treated in the hospitals, health centres and sub-centres in 2014 in Purulia district, after reorganisation of the district in 2017, with data for the year 2013-14. (There may be minor variations because of data recasting).:

.* Excluding nursing homes.

Medical facilities
Medical facilities in Jhalda subdivision are as follows:

Rural Hospitals: (Name, CD block, location, beds) 
Jhalda Rural Hospital, Jhalda I CD block, Jhalda, 30 beds
Muralhar Kotshila Rural Hospital, Jhalda II block, Jindaru, 30 beds
Jaypur Rural Hospital, Joypur CD block, Jaypur 30 beds
Pathardihi Rural Hospital, Baghmundi CD block, Pathardihi, 30 beds

Primary Health Centres : (CD block-wise)(CD block, PHC location, beds)
Baghmundi CD block: Korang (6), Tunturi (10), Ajodhya Hill (PO Ajodhya) (12)
Joypur CD block: Baragram (4), Sidhi (4), Darikuri (10)
Jhalda I CD block: Ilu (10), Mahatomara (6)
Jhalda II CD block: Begunkodor (10), Khatanga (4)

Electoral constituencies

Lok Sabha (parliamentary) and Vidhan Sabha (state assembly) constituencies in Purulia district were as follows:

References

Subdivisions of West Bengal
Subdivisions in Purulia district
Purulia district